Kyle Prepolec (born August 30, 1989) is a Canadian mixed martial arts (MMA) fighter who most recently competed in the Ultimate Fighting Championship's (UFC) Lightweight division. He is the current SMMA Lightweight Champion and had previously won the BTC Catchweight Championship and the TXC Lightweight Championship. He is the #146 current Best Lightweight MMA Fighter.

Background 
Kyle Prepolec was born and raised in Windsor, Ontario, Canada. He, like many Canadians, enjoyed playing hockey until he began training in boxing, finding his true calling in combat sports. He wrestled for 2 years in high school while attending Riverside Secondary School and after graduating began working in construction and home renovations. In 2008 Prepolec decided to pursue a career in mixed martial arts.

Mixed martial arts career

Early career

Prepolec started competing in mixed martial arts professionally in 2008, he fought in regional promotions mostly in Canada and America earning himself a record of 14–5, including a 2 fight run in Bellator facing Lance Snow and Jason Fischer at Bellator 64 and Bellator 76 respectively. During this time he managed to capture 2 Championships in 2 separate promotions. Having previously won both the BTC Catchweight Championship(165 lbs) and the TXC Lightweight Championship when he was invited to sign with the Ultimate Fighting Championship in 2019.

Ultimate Fighting Championship

Making his first walk to the octagon on little more than a week's notice, in a weight class above his fighting weight Kyle Prepolec faced fellow Canadian and UFC veteran of 10 bouts Nordine Taleb in his promotional debut on May 4, 2019 at UFC Fight Night 151. He lost the fight via unanimous decision.

Returning to Lightweight Prepolec was next set to faced Austin Hubbard on September 14, 2019 at UFC Fight Night 158. Prepolec would come out controlling round 1 with his striking staggering his opponent twice, the second round saw more exchanges on the feet.  Hubbard took the fight to the ground. Kyle returned to his feet and continued to exchange until the end of the round. Round 3 saw Prepolec attempt a standing guillotine choke and landed a big elbow on the break, after landing a  left hand he was taken down and controlled for almost the remainder of the round. Prepolec  forced the fight back to the feet with 45 seconds remaining in the fight, landing a left hook and attempting a spinning back fist, he was forced to defend a take down and controlled the rest of the round attempting a modified guillotine choke. Prepolec lost the fight via unanimous decision.

On March 19, 2020, while nursing an injury Prepolec announced he had been released from the promotion.

Post UFC Career

Returning to action after the lockdown in Canada due to Covid-19 Kyle Prepolec faced fellow Canadian Michael Dufort for the inaugural main event of Samuorai 1 for the SMMA Lightweight Championship on November 19, 2021. He won the bout via split decision, becoming the promotions Inaugural Lightweight Champion.

Prepolec faced UFC veteran, Shane Campbell on March 4, 2022 at Unified MMA 43, in a Super Lightweight bout. He lost the bout via unanimous decision.

Prepolec faced Marco Antonio Elpidio on October 22, 2022 at PFC 14. He won the bout by knock out via a head kick in the first round.

Championships and accomplishments
Samourai MMA
SMMA Lightweight Championship
Triple X Cagefighting 
TXC Lightweight Champion
BTC Fight Promotions
BTC Catchweight Champion

Mixed martial arts record

|-
| Win
|align=center|16–8
|Marco Antonio Elpidio 
|KO (head kick)
|PFC 14
|
|align=center|1
|align=center|3:23
|London, Ontario, Canada
|
|-
| Loss
| align=center|15–8
| Shane Campbell
| Decision (unanimous)
| Unified MMA 43
| 
| align=center|3
| align=center|5:00
| Enoch, Alberta, Canada
|
|-
| Win
| align=center|15–7
| Michael Dufort
| Decision (split)
| Samourai MMA 1
| 
| align=center|5
| align=center|5:00
| Montreal, Canada
| 
|-
| Loss
| align=center|14–7
| Austin Hubbard
| Decision (unanimous)
| UFC Fight Night: Cowboy vs. Gaethje
| 
| align=center|3
| align=center|5:00
| Vancouver, British Columbia, Canada
| 
|-
| Loss
| align=center|14–6
| Nordine Taleb
| Decision (unanimous)
| UFC Fight Night: Iaquinta vs. Cowboy
| 
| align=center|3
| align=center|5:00
| Ottawa, Ontario, Canada
| 
|-
| Win
| align=center|14–5
| Cody Pfister
| Decision (unanimous)
| BTC 5: Typhoon
| 
| align=center|3
| align=center|5:00
| Windsor, Ontario, Canada
|
|-
| Win
| align=center|13–5
| Scott Hudson
| TKO (punches)
| BTC 3: Prophecy
| 
| align=center|2
| align=center|1:44
| Burlington, Ontario, Canada
| 
|-
| Loss
| align=center|12–5
| Troy Lamson
| Decision (unanimous)
| KOTC: Second Coming
| 
| align=center|3
| align=center|5:00
| Wyandotte, Michigan, United States
| 
|-
| Win
| align=center| 12–4
| David Newport
| TKO (body punch)
| WXC 66: Night Of Champions 9
| 
| align=center| 2
| align=center| 3:49
| Southgate, Michigan, United States
| 
|-
| Win
| align=center| 11–4
| Adrian Hadribeaj
| KO (spinning backfist)
| TXC Legends 7
| 
| align=center| 4
| align=center| 4:01
| Novi, Michigan, United States
| 
|-
| Loss
| align=center|10–4
| Alex Ricci
| Decision (unanimous)
| GWFC 2
| 
| align=center| 3
| align=center| 2:03
| Burlington, Ontario, Canada
| 
|-
| Win
| align=center| 10–3
| Damion Hill
| Submission (rear naked choke)
| Provincial FC 3
| 
| align=center| 2
| align=center| 0:00
| London, Ontario, Canada
| 
|-
| Win
| align=center| 9–3
| Keven Morin
| Decision (unanimous)
| Provincial FC 2
| 
| align=center| 3
| align=center| 5:00
| London, Ontario, Canada
| 
|-
| Win
| align=center| 8–3
| Adam Assenza
| TKO (knees)
| Provincial FC 1
| 
| align=center| 2
| align=center| 4:40
| London, Ontario, Canada
| 
|-
| Loss
| align=center| 7–3
| Kevin Lee
| Submission (rear naked choke)
| MFL 29
| 
| align=center| 2
| align=center| 2:17
| South Bend, Indiana, United States
| 
|-
| Loss
| align=center| 7–2
| Jason Fischer
| Submission (arm triangle choke)
| Bellator 76
| 
| align=center| 3
| align=center| 3:19
| Windsor, Ontario, Canada
| 
|-
| Win
| align=center| 7–1
| Jason Meisel
| Submission (triangle choke)
| Score Fighting Series 5
| 
| align=center| 2
| align=center| 2:58
| Hamilton, Ontario, Canada
| 
|-
| Win
| align=center| 6–1
| Lance Snow
| Submission (armbar)
| Bellator 64
| 
| align=center| 2
| align=center| 2:54
| Windsor, Ontario, Canada
| 
|-
| Loss
| align=center| 5–1
| Mustafa Khalil
| Decision (unanimous)
| Wreck MMA 8
| 
| align=center| 3
| align=center| 5:00
| Gatineau, Quebec, Canada
| 
|-
| Win
| align=center| 5–0
| Benoit Guionnet
| TKO (punches)
| Ultimate Generation Combat
| 
| align=center| 1
| align=center| 2:19
| Montreal, Quebec, Canada
| 
|-
| Win
| align=center| 4–0
| Keven Pellerin
| TKO (punches)
| Ringside MMA
| 
| align=center| 1
| align=center| 3:36
| Montreal, Quebec, Canada
| 
|-
| Win
| align=center| 3–0
| Pete Brown
| Decision (unanimous)
| Fighting Spirit MMA - Under Fire
| 
| align=center| 3
| align=center| 5:00
| Oneida, Ontario, Canada
| 
|-
| Win
| align=center| 2–0
| Jayson Dawns
| Submission (triangle choke)
| Fighting Spirit MMA - Bloody Valentine
| 
| align=center| 2
| align=center| 4:04
| Oneida, Ontario, Canada
| 
|-
| Win
| align=center| 1–0
| Justin Potter
| TKO (punches)
| Fighting Spirit MMA - Superfights
| 
| align=center| 1
| align=center| 0:30
| Oneida, Ontario, Canada
| 
|-

See also
 List of Canadian UFC fighters
 List of current UFC fighters
 List of male mixed martial artists

References

External links
 
 

1989 births
Living people
Canadian male mixed martial artists
Lightweight mixed martial artists
Mixed martial artists utilizing boxing
Sportspeople from Windsor, Ontario
Ultimate Fighting Championship male fighters